The 1972–73 Drexel Dragons men's basketball team represented Drexel University during the 1972–73 men's basketball season. The Dragons, led by 2nd year head coach Ray Haesler, played their home games at the 32nd Street Armory and were members of the University–Eastern division of the Middle Atlantic Conferences (MAC).

The team finished the season 14–7, and finished in 5th place in the MAC University–Eastern Division in the regular season.

Roster

Schedule

|-
!colspan=9 style="background:#F8B800; color:#002663;"| Regular season
|-

Awards
Mike Fee
MAC All-Conference Honorable Mention

Greg Newman
MAC All-Conference Honorable Mention

References

Drexel Dragons men's basketball seasons
Drexel
1972 in sports in Pennsylvania
1973 in sports in Pennsylvania